Reka is a settlement in the Municipality of Laško in eastern Slovenia. It lies in hills east of Laško. The area is part of the traditional region of Styria. It is now included with the rest of the municipality in the Savinja Statistical Region.

Mass grave
Reka is the site of a mass grave from the end of the Second World War. It contains the remains of 14 Croatian civilians that were shot by a Partisan unit in May 1945 and buried in the orchard below the farm.

References

External links
Reka on Geopedia

Populated places in the Municipality of Laško